Marmara Üniveritesi Spor Women's Football is a women's football team based in Istanbul playing in the Turkish Women's First Football League. It was established in 2003 as part of the multi-sport Marmara Üniversitesi Sports Club at the Physical Education and Sports College of Marmara University.

History
Marmara Üniversitesi Spor advanced to the Women's First League after finishing the 2012–13 season runner-up in the Women's Second League Group 2.

Close to the end of the 2013–14 season, the Arbitration Board of the Turkish Football Federation imposed a penalty of three-point deduction on the team for failing to show at two matches in one period. It was ruled that the opponent teams win by 3–0 in forfeit against Marmara Üniversitesi Spor following that match date.

Colors
The colors of Marmara Üniversitesi Spor are blue and black.

Stadium
The team play their home matches at the Anadoluhisarı Akademi Stadium, which is situated inside the multi-sport facilities of the university at Anadoluhisarı neighborhood of Beykoz district . The venue's  ground is covered by artificial turf.

Statistics

Current squad

Head coach:  Atakan Çağlayan

 (Captain)

References

External links
Marmara Üniversitesi Spor at Turkish Football Federation 

 
Women's football clubs in Turkey
Association football clubs established in 2003
2003 establishments in Turkey
Football clubs in Istanbul